Koval may refer to: 
Koval (surname)
Koval Distillery, a craft distillery in Chicago, Illinois

Fiction
Funky Koval, a 1980s Polish comic book
Koval, a Romulan in Inter Arma Enim Silent Leges (Star Trek: Deep Space Nine)

See also
 
Kowal (disambiguation)
Kovel, a city in Ukraine